David Diamond may refer to:
 David Diamond (composer) (1915–2005), American composer
 David Diamond (journalist)
 David Diamond (screenwriter), American screenwriter
 David Diamond (theatre), theatre artistic director
 David Diamond, frontman and songwriter with Canadian band The Kings
 David Diamond, guitarist/keyboardist for the band Berlin
 David M. Diamond, neuroscientist
 David Diamond (producer), American film producer